Bensafrim e Barão de São João is a civil parish in the municipality of Lagos, Portugal. It was formed in 2013 by the merger of the former parishes Bensafrim and Barão de São João. The population in 2011 was 2,425, in an area of 130.20 km².

References

Parishes of Lagos, Portugal